Joseph-Hippolyte Guibert (1802, Aix-en-Provence, Bouches-du-Rhône – 1886, Paris) was a French Catholic Archbishop of Paris and Cardinal.

He was consecrated by Eugène de Mazenod and was appointed by Pope Gregory XVI as bishop of Viviers in 1842, and archbishop of Tours in 1857. He became Archbishop of Paris in 1871, and a Cardinal in 1873.  He participated in the 1878 conclave.

References

External links
Biography

1802 births
1886 deaths
People from Aix-en-Provence
19th-century French cardinals
Cardinals created by Pope Pius IX
Archbishops of Paris
Archbishops of Tours
Bishops of Viviers
Bishops appointed by Pope Gregory XVI
Missionary Oblates of Mary Immaculate